Führerhauptquartier Wolfsschlucht II (English: Wolf Canyon) or W2  was the codename used for one of Adolf Hitler's World War II Western Front military headquarters located in Margival, 10 km northeast of Soissons in the department of Aisne in France. It was one of many Führer Headquarters throughout Europe but was used only once by Adolf Hitler, June 16 and 17, 1944 for a meeting with Field Marshals Erwin Rommel and Gerd von Rundstedt about the Normandy Front.

At the meeting, Rommel advocated, among other things, ending the war, to Hitler's fury. During the meeting, an allied air raid forced the group to descend into a bomb shelter. Later, a malfunctioning V-1 flying bomb struck the site, after which Hitler departed for Germany, never to return.

See also 

Führer Headquarters

References

External links

 Website of the W2 safeguarding association; site closed in 2016
 Führer headquarters Wolfsschlucht II on Bunkersite.com
 Wolfsschlucht 2 
 

World War II sites of Nazi Germany
Fuehrer Headquarters
Buildings and structures in Aisne
World War II sites in France